Josef Pešek is a former ice dancer who competed for Czechoslovakia. With Milena Tůmová, he became a three-time national medalist and competed at four ISU Championships. The duo finished in the top ten at the 1968 European Championships in Västerås, Sweden, and 1969 European Championships in Garmisch-Partenkirchen, West Germany. They placed 12th at the 1968 World Championships in Geneva, Switzerland. They represented Prague.

Competitive highlights 
(with Tůmová)

References 

Czechoslovak male ice dancers
Living people
Figure skaters from Prague
Year of birth missing (living people)